Stolen Moments is album by American banjoist Alison Brown, and was released in 2005.

Guest artists include Sam Bush, Mary Chapin Carpenter, Beth Nielsen Chapman, Stuart Duncan and Indigo Girls Amy Ray and Emily Saliers.

Reception 

In his Allmusic review, music critic James Christopher Monger praised the album and wrote "the most alluring piece appears at the end of Stolen Moments; the self-penned mandolin, conga, and banjo-driven "Musette for a Palindrome" is so unlike anything else on the record that one can only hope that it's merely a teaser for the next. More like this please."

Writing for No Depression, Robert L. Doerschuk compared Brown to Béla Fleck, summarizing the album as "one more step toward enlightenment, so that even the dimmest bulbs can understand why Brown’s similarities to Fleck — mainly, jaw-dropping virtuosity — are ultimately beside the point..." and referred to Brown's aesthetic: "simple, eloquent, and fully original."

Track listing 
All compositions by Alison Brown unless otherwise noted
 "The Sound of Summer Running" – 4:21
 "The Magnificent Seven" (Brown, Doyle) – 3:53
 "Homeward Bound" (Paul Simon) – 4:04
 "The Pirate Queen" – 4:29
 "Carrowkeel" – 3:59
 "Angel" (Jimi Hendrix) main vocals by Beth Nielsen Chapman – 4:35
 "McIntyre Heads South" (Brown, West) – 4:00
 "One Morning in May" (Keith, Rooney) – 4:34
 "(I'm Naked and I'm) Going to Glasgow" – 6:48
 "Prayer Wheel" (Hewerdine) – 4:40
 "Musette for a Palindrome" – 5:12

Personnel
 Alison Brown – banjo, guitar
 Sam Bush – mandolin on The Magnificent Seven
 Mary Chapin Carpenter – vocals on Prayer Wheel
 Beth Nielsen Chapman – vocals on Angel
 John Doyle – guitar
 Stuart Duncan – fiddle on The Sound Of Summer Running
 Kenny Malone – drums
 Mike Marshall – guitar, mandolin
 Max E. Pad – piano
 Amy Ray – vocals on Homeward Bound
 Emily Saliers – vocals on Homeward Bound
 Garry West – bass
 Seamus Egan - low whistle on Carrowkeel
 Andrea Zonn - vocals on One Morning In May

References

2005 albums
Alison Brown albums
Compass Records albums